Jim Gibbons may refer to:

Jim Gibbons (American politician) (born 1944), Republican governor of Nevada
Jim Gibbons (Irish politician) (1924–1997), Irish Fianna Fáil politician and government minister
His son Jim Gibbons Jnr (born 1954), former Irish Progressive Democrats Senator
Jim Gibbons (American football) (1936–2016), American football player
Jim Gibbons (businessman), former CEO of Goodwill Industries
Jim Gibbons (sportscaster), American sportscaster

See also 
 James Gibbons (disambiguation)